Moje 3 (English: My 3) was a Serbian girl group consisting of Mirna Radulović, Nevena Božović and Sara Jovanović. They represented Serbia in the Eurovision Song Contest 2013 in Malmö with the song "Ljubav je svuda". The group performed on the first semi-final and failed to qualify for the final of the contest. After Eurovision, the group disbanded for its members to resume their solo careers.

Band history

2012-13: Prvi glas Srbije 
Mirna Radulović, Nevena Božović, and Sara Jovanović met during the early stages of the second season of Prvi glas Srbije (English: The First Voice of Serbia), a Serbian music talent show similar to The Voice, as all three of them had been picked by the judge Aleksandra Radović for her coaching group. Radulović, Božović and Jovanović eventually progressed to the grand final, which was held on 20 January 2013, and, respectively, placed first, second and third.

2013: Eurovision Song Contest 2013 and disbandment 
In February 2013, it was announced that Radulović, Božović and Jovanović would take part in Beosong 2013, the Serbian national election for the Eurovision Song Contest 2013, under the name Moje 3. Their song, "Ljubav je svuda" (English: Love Is All Around), was composed and produced by Saša Milošević Mare, with lyrics by Marina Tucaković. Saša Milošević Mare was one of the three judges on Prvi glas Srbije and had previously composed Serbia's 2007 Contest winning entry "Molitva", while Tucaković had previously composed Serbia's 2010 and 2012 entries. On 2 March 2013, Moje 3 competed in the semi-final of the national selection, successfully securing one of five spots for the final of the competition. On 3 March 2013, Moje 3 won Beosong 2013 and the right to represent Serbia at the Eurovision Song Contest 2013 in Malmö, Sweden.

Prior to the Eurovision Song Contest, Moje 3 released promotional versions of their song in different arrangements and in different languages. In addition, they performed at the Eurovision In Concert event in Amsterdam on 13 April 2013. Serbia was allocated to perform in the first semi-final of the 2013 Contest on 14 May 2013, with the producer determined running order assigning Serbia to close the show and perform 16th. The song failed to qualify to the final, placing 11th in the semi-final and scoring 46 points. Moje 3 subsequently won the Barbara Dex Award, a humorous award given to the worst dressed artist each year in the contest.

Prior to their collaboration, Radulović, Božović and Jovanović explained that they would not be forming a band and that they would only perform as a trio for Beosong. In late May 2013, Moje 3 announced their disbandment as the members continued working on their solo careers.

Other work 
On 31 January 2013, Radulović, Božović and Jovanović participated in charity cooking at the Drinka Pavlović Orphanage in Belgrade.

Discography

Singles 
 2013 — "Ljubav je svuda"
 2013 — "Nisi Sam" (Charity song)

Awards 
 2013 — Barbara Dex Award

See also 
 Eurovision Song Contest 2013
 Serbia in the Eurovision Song Contest
 Serbia in the Eurovision Song Contest 2013

References

External links 
 Moje 3 at the official website of the Eurovision Song Contest

Eurovision Song Contest entrants of 2013
Eurovision Song Contest entrants for Serbia
Serbian pop music groups
Serbian girl groups